Crossocerus wesmaeli  is a Palearctic species of solitary wasp.

References

External links
Images representing Crossocerus wesmaeli

Hymenoptera of Europe
Crabronidae
Insects described in 1829